Alan Cotter may refer to:
 Alan Cotter (rugby union)
 Alan Cotter (rowing)